A Volta do Filho Pródigo is a 1978 Brazilian film directed by Ipojuca Pontes.

Cast
Helber Rangel	...	Antônio Maria
Dilma Lóes	...	Rita
Marlene	...	Antônio's Mother
Jaime Barcellos	...	Macedo, the taylor
Dinorah Brillanti	...	Belmira
B. de Paiva	...	Ceará
Jota Diniz	...	Twenty-One
José Dumont	...	The Unemployed
Carlos Gregório	...	Boss's Son
Adalberto Nunes	...	Sebastião, Antônio's friend
Tereza Rachel	...	Cléa, Antônio's lover

Awards 
1979: Gramado Film Festival
Best Actor (Helber Rangel) (won)
Best Supporting Actress (Dilma Lóes) (won)
Best Film (Nominee)

1981: São Paulo Association of Art Critics Awards
Best Film (won)
Best Actor (Helber Rangel) (won) 
Best Actress (Dilma Lóes 
Best Supporting Actress (Tereza Raquel) (won) 
Best Director (Ipojuca Pontes) (won)

References

External links 
 

1978 films
1970s Portuguese-language films
Brazilian crime drama films
Best Picture APCA Award winners